Bernhard Herbert Garside  (born 21 January 1962) is a British diplomat who served as Ambassador to El Salvador from 2015 to 2019.

Career 
Garside attended the University of Glasgow and obtained an MA in German and Social & Political Philosophy.

He joined the Foreign Office in 1983 and postings included Oman, UAE, Nigeria, Cuba, Netherlands, Sudan, Algeria, El Salvador and Ecuador. 

He was appointed Officer of the Order of the British Empire (OBE) in the 2020 Birthday Honours for services to British foreign policy.

In latter years he worked in Protocol Directorate in London and was responsible for VIP transport logistics at NATO, G7 in Cornwall and COP26 in Glasgow in 2021. Garside retired from the Foreign Office (FCDO) in July 2022 and moved to Glenuig in West Scotland to help run an Inn.

References

External links 
 Twitter

Living people
1962 births
21st-century British diplomats
Ambassadors of the United Kingdom to El Salvador
Alumni of the University of Glasgow
Officers of the Order of the British Empire